Yellow mY skYcaptain is the debut solo album by A Perfect Circle strings and bass player Paz Lenchantin, released in year 2000. The album was produced by Lenchantin herself.

Track listing
 "Missin'" - 1:32
 "Dusty Dolls" - 5:30
 "Blue Sky Shoe Shine" - 1:26
 "Yarrow" - 4:08
 "She Can Soup" - 3:41
 "Lil' Tree" - 2:51
 "T.V. Snow" - 3:09
 "Video Game" - 5:18
 "Rainbow Zen" - 5:19
 "U" - 1:53

Personnel
 Paz Lenchantin - lyrics, performance
 Ryeland Allison - drums
 Luciano Lenchantin - guitar on "T.V. Snow"
 Maynard James Keenan - album cover

References
http://www.webmusicdb.com/disp?20949

2000 debut albums
Paz Lenchantin albums